Hail is the first LP album released in 1988 by New Zealand band, Straitjacket Fits.  There were three releases of the album, a New Zealand release in 1988, a United Kingdom and United States release also in 1988 and an extended album in 1989. The UK/US release featured tracks which had earlier been released in New Zealand on the Life in One Chord EP; the 1989 release contained all the songs from both the New Zealand album and the earlier EP.

Most of the songs on the album were credited to Shayne Carter/Straitjacket Fits, the exceptions being "Sparkle That Shines", "Take From The Years" and "Fabulous Things" (all Andrew Brough/Straitjacket Fits), and a cover of Leonard Cohen's song "So Long, Marianne". This was the only cover version recorded on any of Straitjacket Fits' albums.

The album was well received, though the band were disappointed that the sound of the finished release failed to capture either their live sound or the intensity of their debut EP. Rip It Up described it as having "tidal waves of sweetly distorted guitar noise that spill over and around the vocal harmonies."

The title track and "Sparkle That Shines" were both released as singles from the album.

Track listing

References

Straitjacket Fits albums
1988 debut albums
Flying Nun Records albums
Rough Trade Records albums
Dunedin Sound albums